Virola venosa is a species of tree in the family Myristicaceae. It is found in Colombia, Venezuela and Brazil (in Amapá, Amazonas, Pará and Rondônia).

Varieties
Virola venosa var. pavonis (A.DC.) Warb.

References

venosa
Flora of Brazil
Flora of Colombia
Flora of Venezuela
Flora of Rondônia
Flora of the Amazon
Plants described in 1853